David Jeffrey Hancock (24 July 1938 – 6 June 2007) was an English professional footballer. He was born in Exeter, Devon and played for all three of the county's professional football teams as well as for the National Team, England.

Hancock began his career as a junior with Plymouth Argyle, turning professional in September 1955. He played twice in the league for Argyle during the 1956–57 season, but failed to make any further appearances and left to join Torquay United in January 1959. He made 177 league appearances for Torquay, scoring twelve goals, and played in the 1959–60 promotion winning side. In March 1964, he moved to Exeter City, scoring 3 times in 40 games before leaving to join South African side Durban United.

Hancock died on 6 June 2007 at the age of 68.

References

External links 
Dave Hancock, Post War English & Scottish Football League A–Z Player's Database

1938 births
2007 deaths
Sportspeople from Exeter
Footballers from Devon
English footballers
Association football wing halves
Plymouth Argyle F.C. players
Torquay United F.C. players
Exeter City F.C. players
Durban United F.C. players
English Football League players
English expatriate footballers
English expatriate sportspeople in South Africa